Flip City may refer to:

 a phrase uttered by Cheech Marin on the 1974 Joni Mitchell album Court and Spark
 a 1974-75 pub rock band featuring Elvis Costello
 a Glenn Frey song from the Ghostbusters II soundtrack
 a song by The Flyin' Ryan Brothers from their 1999 album Colorama
 the fictional hometown of the cartoon RollBots
 an indoor trampoline park located in Palmerston North